Mahbubur Raschid was a Pakistani banker who served as the fourth Governor of the State Bank of Pakistan from 1967 to 1971.

References

Governors of the State Bank of Pakistan